Ribble may refer to:

 River Ribble, in North Yorkshire and Lancashire, England
 Ribble and Alt Estuaries
 River Ribble, West Yorkshire, England
 Ribble Motor Services, a former bus company in North West England
 Ribble Valley, a local government district in Lancashire, England
 Ribble Valley (UK Parliament constituency) in Lancashire, England
 HMS Ribble, a British Royal Navy vessel
 Reid Ribble, American politician, U.S. Representative for Wisconsin from 2011 to 2017